Patricia McLinn (born in Illinois) is the author of more than 40 novels in the genres of romance, women's fiction and mystery fiction.

Biography
Patricia McLinn attended Northwestern University, where she obtained her BA in English Composition in only three years. She continued at Northwestern, obtaining her Masters in Journalism in her fourth year.

McLinn began her journalism career as a sports writer for the Rockford Register Star (Illinois). She went on to become the assistant sports editor at the Charlotte Observer (North Carolina) before moving on to The Washington Post. In more than 20 years at the Washington Post, she was copy chief for the sports department and an editor for the news service, among other positions.

McLinn began seriously writing as a break from chipping away at layer upon layer of wallpaper in a home improvement frenzy. According to McLinn, she began pursuing publication after hearing a talk by a writer who introduced her to the Washington, D.C. Chapter of Romance Writers of America.

In 1990, McLinn published her first novel, Hoops for Silhouette. Hoops was a RITA award  finalist and won the New Jersey Romance Writers Golden Leaf Award. Since then, McLinn has published an additional 40 books. Hoops, as well as books such as The Games (Winter Olympics) and Rodeo Nights, call on McLinn's background as a sports writer. Research trips to Wyoming have resulted in several of McLinn's subsequent romance series being set in that rugged state, as she discussed in a recent The Joys of Binge Reading podcast.

McLinn has written for Harlequin Enterprises, Delphi Books and Belle Books, as well as independent e-publishing through A Writer's Work, and the usual array of commercial outlets.  She has spoken about writing from Melbourne, Australia, to Washington, D.C., including being a guest-speaker at the Smithsonian Institution. 

She started a mystery series, Caught Dead in Wyoming, in 2012 with Sign Off, a finalist for the EPIC Mystery eBook award. The latest Caught Dead in Wyoming novel, Cold Open (Book 7), released in August 2018, and an eighth book, Hot Roll, is scheduled for a spring 2019 release. A new mystery with romance, set in Virginia and titled Proof of Innocence, was published in May 2018. A sequel to that book, Price of Innocence, is scheduled to be published in 2019.

In 2018, McLinn started a podcast, Authors Love Readers. The podcast, hosted by McLinn, is  described as a weekly conversation between authors about how and why they create stories. Guest authors write in all sorts of fiction genres and take varied paths to publication – independent, traditional, hybrid and other combinations.

Awards
2007, Washington Romance Writers, Outstanding Achievement Award 
2006, Cataromance Reviewers Choice Award Nominee, The Right Brother
2006, Cataromance Reviewers Choice Award Nominee, The Games
2005, RT Reviews, Series Storyteller Of The Year Award Winner
2003, Voted eHarlequin Readers’ Favorite Special Edition, The Unexpected Wedding Guest 
2003, National Readers Choice Award finalist, Wedding of the Century
2003, Golden Quill finalist, Wedding of the Century
2003, Voted eHarlequin Readers’ Favorite Special Edition, Wedding of the Century
2002, More Than Magic Award finalist, The Runaway Bride
2001, WisRW Write Touch Readers Award finalist, Match Make in Wyoming
2001, OCRW Orange Rose Award finalist, Match Make in Wyoming
2001, GDRW Booksellers Best Award finalist, Almost A Bride
2000, SARA Rising Star Award winner, Hidden In A Heartbeat
2000, VRW HOLT finalist, Hidden In A Heartbeat
2000, VRW HOLT finalist, At the Heart's Command
2000, 2000 Affaire de Coeur Reader-Writer Poll—Best Contemporary Category Novel finalist, Lost and Found Groom
1998, GRW Maggie finalist, The Rancher Meets His Match
1997, VRW HOLT finalist, A Stranger To Love
1995, VRW HOLT finalist, A Stranger in the Family
1991, GRW Maggie finalist,  Prelude to a Wedding
1990, Affaire de Coeur (contemporary author of the year) finalist, A New World
1990, RITA Finalist, Hoops
1990, NJRW Golden Leaf winner, Hoops

Publications

Caught Dead in Wyoming
• Sign Off
• Left Hanging
• Shoot First
• Last Ditch
• Look Live
• Back Story
• Cold Open
• Hot Roll (2019)

Single novels
• Price of Innocence (2019)
• Proof of Innocence
• Ride the River: Rodeo Knights
• The Games
• Courting a Cowboy
• Widow Woman

The Wedding Series
• Prelude to a Wedding
• Wedding Party
• Grady's Wedding
• The Runaway Bride
• The Christmas Princess
• Hoops
• The Surprise Princess
• Not a Family Man
• The Forgotten Prince

Bardville, Wyoming
• A Stranger In the Family
• A Stranger to Love
• The Rancher Meets his Match

A Place Called Home
• Lost and Found Groom
• At the Heart's Command
• Hidden in a Heartbeat

Wyoming Wildflowers
• Wyoming Wildflowers: The Beginning (prequel)
• Almost a Bride
• Match Make in Wyoming
• My Heart Remembers
• A New World (prequel to Jack's Heart)
• Jack's Heart
• Rodeo Nights (prequel to Where Love Lives)
• Where Love Lives
• A Cowboy Wedding

Marry Me
• Wedding of the Century
• The Unexpected Wedding Guest
• A Most Unikely Wedding
• Baby Blues and Wedding Bells

Seasons in a Small Town
• What Are Friends For?
• The Right Brother
• Falling for Her
• Warm Front

References

External links 
 PatriciaMcLinn.com
 AuthorsLoveReaders.com

Year of birth missing (living people)
Living people
People from Rockford, Illinois
20th-century American novelists
21st-century American novelists
American women novelists
Northwestern University alumni
20th-century American women writers
21st-century American women writers
Medill School of Journalism alumni